Marko Lapinkoski (born October 2, 1969) is a Finnish former professional ice hockey forward.

Lapinkoski played 114 regular season games in the SM-liiga for Oulun Kärpät and Tappara. He also had a two season stint in France for Anglet Hormadi Élite.

Lapinkoski played in the World Junior Ice Hockey Championships with Finland in 1988, where he won a bronze medal, and 1989.

References

External links

1969 births
Living people
Anglet Hormadi Élite players
Finnish ice hockey forwards
Kiekko-Laser players
Kokkolan Hermes players
Oulun Kärpät players
Sportspeople from Oulu
Tappara players